The Amendments to the National Wool Act Pub. L. 103-130 (selected provisions), 107 Stat. 1368-1369 (1993), signed into law November 1, 1993, phased out wool and mohair price supports at the end of 1995.

See also
National Partnership for Reinventing Government
National Wool Act of 1954

References

External links
 
 
 

1993 in American law
United States federal agriculture legislation
103rd United States Congress
Wool trade